Wanda Capodaglio (1 January 1889 – 30 August 1980) was an Italian film actress. She appeared in 30 films between 1914 and 1970. Her brother Ruggero was married to actress Anna Capodaglio (the stage name of Anna Adele Alberta Gramatica) who was also the sister of actresses Emma Gramatica and Irma Gramatica.

Filmography

References

External links
 

1889 births
1980 deaths
Italian film actresses
Italian silent film actresses
People from Asti
20th-century Italian actresses